Residential Care Centre, Seyyed Abbas ( – Menāzl Masḵūnī Marḵaz Khodmāt) is a village in Seyyed Abbas Rural District, Shavur District, Shush County, Khuzestan Province, Iran. At the 2006 census, its population was 376, in 56 families.

References 

Populated places in Shush County